Burundi is divided into eighteen provinces, each named after their respective capital with the exception of Bujumbura Rural.

Burundi’s provinces and communes were created on Christmas Day in 1959 by a Belgian colonial decree. They replaced the pre-existing system of chieftains.

In 2000, the province encompassing Bujumbura was separated into two provinces, Bujumbura Rural and Bujumbura Mairie. The newest province, Rumonge, was created on 26 March 2015 from portions of Bujumbura Rural and Bururi.

In July 2022, the government of Burundi announced a complete overhaul of the country’s territorial subdivisions. The proposed change would reduce the amounts of provinces from 18 to 5, and reduce the amount of communes from 119 to 42. The change needs the approval of the National Assembly and the Senate to take effect.

See also
Communes of Burundi
Collines of Burundi
Geography of Burundi
List of Burundian provinces by area
List of Burundian provinces by population
List of Burundian provincial governors
ISO 3166-2:BI

References

 
Subdivisions of Burundi
Lists of subdivisions of Burundi
Burundi 1
Provinces, Burundi

hu:Burundi#Közigazgatási felosztás